Victor Murat "Chock" Kelley (October 31, 1887 – July 25, 1958) was a college football player and coach. He played quarterback for the Texas A&M Aggies football team and would later become the coach of the Carlisle Indians. Carlisle paid him a salary of $4,000 a year. He was also an assistant coach of the 1921 SMU Mustangs.

References

1887 births
1958 deaths
American football quarterbacks
Austin Kangaroos football coaches
Carlisle Indians football coaches
Texas A&M Aggies football players
Coaches of American football from Oklahoma
Players of American football from Oklahoma